Encephalartos trispinosus is a species of cycad that is native to South Africa.

Description
It is a cycad with an erect stem up to 1 m tall and with a diameter of 25-30 cm, often with secondary stems originating from basal suckers. 
The leaves, pinnate, arranged in a crown at the apex of the stem, from gray-greenish to blue, are up to 1.4 m long, composed of numerous pairs of obovate, coriaceous, tomentose leaves, up to 18 cm long, with 1-3 spines on the lower margin and a pungent apex.
It is a dioecious species, with male specimens that have 1 or rarely 2 erect, sub-cylindrical cones, 25–35 cm long and about 8 cm broad, yellow to green in color, and female specimens with solitary cylindrical-ovoid cones, long about 40–50 cm and wide 16–18 cm, with a conical apex, yellow to greenish-yellow in color.
The seeds are roughly ovoid, about 3.5 cm long, covered with a brown to red sarcotesta.

References

External links
 
 

trispinosus
Endemic flora of South Africa
Vulnerable flora of Africa